Hoppers Crossing SC is a football (soccer) club based in Hoppers Crossing, Victoria, Australia. The club was formerly known as the Mossfiel Rangers Soccer Club which was formed by club founders Ken Slack, Ray Wilkinson, Stan Walkden and Ron Tutchell in 1971. 

In 1991, the club changed its name to gain a closer affiliation with the quickly growing Hoppers Crossing area. Currently the club's senior men's team play in the Victorian State League Division 2 and women's teams play in the Victorian State League Division 1 North-West competition.Last known scorer Dane Garbett against Westgate.

History
 
Mossfiel Rangers Soccer club was formed in 1971 by Ken Slack, Ray Wilkinson, Stan Walkden and Ron Tutchell and only consisted of one Under 10 and one Under 11 boys team.  The home ground was based on the site where the Karobran kindergarten now resides.  The land was provided by shearer H.L. Baden Powell
 
In 1976, Mossfiel Rangers moved to Mossfiel Reserve, where they stayed until 2005 before moving to new facilities at Grange Reserve under the Hoppers Crossing Soccer Club name.
 
Between 1976 and 1978, senior football was played with teams entered into the District League West division.  From 1979 to 1981,the senior teams played in the Amateur Leagues before moving into the Victorian Soccer Federations Provisional League 4.
 
In 1983, the club achieved its first promotion in its history by finishing in second place of Provisional League Div 4, followed by another successful year in 1987 – again finishing second in Provisional League 2.
 
1990 would see the club relegated for the first time in its history by finishing 14th in Provisional League 2 – where it would stay until the club's first senior championship was won in 1999.  The 2nd club championship was won in 2001 which saw the club promoted into the Victorian Soccer Federations State League structure – only to last until 2004 where it was again relegated to the Provisional Leagues.
 
2012 saw the beginning of the club's most successful era, with the senior team winning championships in 2012 (Provisional League 2), 2014 State League 4 West and 2015 State League 3 North-West and finishing second in the 2017 State League 2 North-West competition. Hoppers Crossing were unable to hold their place in State League 1 NW in 2018, the first time in the club's history they had played in the state's third tier, finishing in second-bottom place.

Women in Football
In 2016, the club re-introduced senior women's football, establishing a team that won the State League 4 West Championship at its first attempt.  In the semi-finals, Hoppers Crossing defeated Women's State League 4 North champions Meadow Park SC 4–0.  The final was forfeited by Knox City FC, giving the title of overall FFV State League 4 Champions.

In 2017, The Lady Reds finished runners up in State League 3 West, earning a promotion play-off spot against North Runner-up Mill Park, which was won 6–4.  The victory earned a sudden death play-off against the 3rd last team from 2nd Division – Yarraville Glory.  With a huge buildup through the week, Yarraville forfeited the match which saw the Lady Reds promoted to Victorian State League Division 2 North/West in season 2018.

Club name changes
 
 1971 – Mossfiel Rangers Soccer Club
 1991 – Hoppers Crossing Soccer Club

Current Men's squad
 

 Stefaan Sardelic 
 Kieron Sharratt 
 Benjamin Sardelic 
 Brian Chesson [Captain ]
 Dane Garbett 
 Kyoungjin Jeong 
 Morgan Filer 
 Steven Smart
 Andre Ruiz 
 Kevin Smart 
 Kwaku Dade 
 Jason Hayne 
 Matthew Scott 
 Ryan Murray 
 Kyung Min Shin 
 Alister Smart 
 Daniel Sweeney 
 Simon Tolli
 Darryl Roach
 Liam Mcdermott 
 Hope Mirindi

Current Women's squad
 

 Sofia Alvarenga
 Naomi Loau
 Brianne Campana
 Kathryn Larkin
 Nermina Demirovic
 Kelly Black
 Deby Taylor
 Juliane Alburquerque
 Sara Demirovic
 Leonora Wharehinga
 Christina Georgiou
 Yajaira Appeldorff
 Karly Rigg
 Margot Robinne
 Julia Budiongo
 Nyankor Joseph
 Ellie Bujupi
 Milka Lodiong
 Mylene Deschamps

Honours

Club

Men
Victorian State League Division 2
Runners-up (1): 2017
Victorian State League Division 3
Champions (1): 2015
Victorian State League Division 4
Champions (1): 2014
Provisional League 1 North West
Champions (1): 2001,
Provisional League 2 North West
Champions (2): 1999, 2012,

Women
Victorian State League Division 4 West
Champions (1): 2016

Victorian State League Division 3 West
Runners-up (1): 2017

Women
Victorian State League Division 2 North/West
Champions (1): 2018

Individual
Provisional League 3 Player of the Year
1984 – Nat Little
Provisional League 2 Player of the Year
1987 – Jimmy Leonard
Provisional League 1 Player of the Year
1988 – Jimmy Leonard
Provisional League 2 North West Player of the Year
1999 – Dragi Mitrevski and Scott Murray
Provisional League 1 North West Top Goalscorer
1999 – Dragi Mitrevski – 18 goals
Provisional League 1 North West Player of the Year
2001 – Ken Smart
Provisional League 1 North West Top Goalscorer
2006 – Robert Nedlekov – 25 goals
Provisional League 2 North West Player of the Year Player of the Year2012 – Zia SherzaiProvisional League 2 North West Top Goalscorer2012 – Alister Smart – 23 goalsVictorian State League Division 4 Player of the Year'''
2014 – Zia Sherzai

References

External links
 Hoppers Crossing SC Official website
 OzFootball Hoppers Crossing SC Page
 Football Federation Victoria Official website

Soccer clubs in Melbourne
Association football clubs established in 1971
1971 establishments in Australia
Sport in the City of Wyndham